James Anthony Courtney (born 29 June 1980) is an Australian racing driver competing in the Repco Supercars Championship. He currently drives the No. 5 Ford Mustang GT for Tickford Racing. Courtney won the 2010 V8 Supercar Championship Series driving for the Dick Johnson Racing team.

Early career
Courtney has raced and was successful in several other categories, most of which are regarded as the stepping stones to Formula One. He was World Junior Karting Champion in 1995 and world Formula A Champion in 1997. He was British Formula Ford champion in 2000 and broke the record for winning the most Formula Ford races in one season. He drove for the Jaguar Junior Formula Three team in 2001, impressively winning his first F3 race on his F3 debut. He was also a test driver for Jaguar's Formula One team. Injuries from a high-speed test crash at Monza in 2002, due to failure of the rear wing on the Jaguar F1 car, led to him missing some races in that year's British Formula 3 Championship so he could not win the title—although he was easily leading it at that stage. In 2003, he was All-Japan Formula Three champion for the TOM'S team. In 2004 and 2005 he raced in the All Japan Grand Touring Car Championship for Toyota.

James Courtney is managed by BTCC/TOCA boss Alan J. Gow, who was instrumental in his European open-wheeler career leading to his testing role with Jaguar Racing. He appeared in the 2007 season of Dancing with the Stars, on the Seven Network.

Jaguar F1 testing crash

While testing for the Jaguar Racing Formula One team in Monza in 2002, the rear suspension failed on Courtney's car, sending him into the barrier at 306 km/h. The car hit with such force that it bounced back from the wall at 70 km/h, causing Courtney to suffer an impact estimated at 67G. When he regained consciousness, he found the man who had pulled him from the wreck, multiple World Champion Michael Schumacher who had been at the circuit testing for Ferrari, shouting at him, trying to translate for the Italian track marshals who could not speak English. Courtney "freaked out" when he found that he could not move the right side of his body and was bleeding from his eyes. He explained that "it took me a year to recover. I couldn't walk without getting a migraine. Anything would set it off. Noise, light, anything." Courtney also revealed that he could not see for weeks after the accident, and that he decided at that point never to be scared of having a crash again, stating "It's over if you are scared. It is all or nothing".

Supercars Championship
James Courtney debuted in V8 Supercars in 2005 with the Holden Racing Team in the endurance races with co-driving with Jim Richards but enjoyed limited success.

Stone Brothers Racing
In 2006, he joined Ford team Stone Brothers Racing to replace two-time champion Marcos Ambrose. He crashed the car on debut in Adelaide but recovered to finished third in the 2006 Bathurst 1000 and followed it up with a second place in the 2007 Bathurst 1000. On 19 July 2008 Courtney collected his first V8 Supercar race win, taking out race one of the City of Ipswich 400 at Queensland Raceway. He finished the year sixth in the championship.

Dick Johnson Racing
In 2009, he switched to Dick Johnson Racing. He was given a brand new Triple Eight Race Engineering built Ford FG Falcon and was regarded by many as a serious threat for the title. This came undone at the start of the year, with an accident marred start to the season. Courtney took wins at the new events at Townsville and Sydney and finished the year in seventh.In 2010, Courtney his best season to date, with podiums at Adelaide, Melbourne GP and Hamilton, and five race wins; two each at Queensland Raceway and Winton, and one at Sandown. He won the 2010 V8 Supercar Championship Series, ahead of 2009 V8 Supercar champion Jamie Whincup. It marked the first time in 15 years that a Dick Johnson Racing entry had won the championship. In the immediate post-season, however, Courtney signed a deal to leave the team and join the Holden Racing Team.

Walkinshaw Andretti United
Since joining Walkinshaw Andretti United, Courtney has had limited success, taking just one race win at the 2011 Yas V8 400. After his win at Abu Dhabi, he struggled during the season with little success at most rounds with a best finish of 4th at Adelaide. He then achieved a 2nd at Sandown. He finished tenth in the 2011 championship with 1869 points, while his teammate Garth Tander finished fifth with 2574 points and 2011 Champion Jamie Whincup amassed 3168 points.

After the first race of the 2012 race, the Clipsal 500 on the Adelaide street circuit, he was in 28th place in the championship.Courtney retained his seat at the Holden Racing Team for 2012 alongside Garth Tander. Courtney's season started with a crash at the Clipsal 500 Adelaide in race 1 and a 25th in race 2. He then finished 18th in the first race of Symmons Plains but recorded an impressive 8th in race 2. He now sits 21st in the championship with 171 points while Tander is in 6th with 368 points.Courtney sat out the final four races of the 2013 Championship Series after a severe incident during Race 32 at the Phillip Island Grand Prix Circuit. As Courtney entered the turn 4 hairpin (Honda Corner) an out of control Alexandre Prémat, after suffering a delaminated tyre, made heavy contact to the driver's side window of James Courtney's car with the rear of his own after hitting a slight mound in the grass. The incident caused significant damage to both cars including snapping the safety bars of Courtney's car. Both cars inevitably could not compete in the next two races held on the weekend. James suffered a tear in his right quad muscle and a fractured tibia. HRT endurance co-driver Nick Percat replaced him for the final two races of the season at the Sydney 500.Courtney withdrew from the 2015 Sydney Motorsport Park Super Sprint after sustaining chest injuries whilst standing in pit lane when he was hit by an airborne piece of metal signage blown through the air by a low flying Navy helicopter. He was admitted to hospital with two broken ribs and a punctured lung. Endurance co-driver Jack Perkins substituted for Courtney while he recovered in hospital. On 26 August 2015, Courtney confirmed that he would not participate in the Sandown 500 to recover from his injuries. There was a last-minute decision at the Bathurst 1000, where he decided not to race. He returned at the Gold Coast 600, winning the 300 km race on Sunday with Perkins.

Personal life
Courtney is divorced and has a daughter named Zara, and a younger son named Cadel. Courtney was born with a twin sister, and resides near the Gold Coast, Queensland. He has done so since driving for Stone Brothers Racing in 2006. He is an enthusiast of quality watches and drives a HSV GTS.

In a short interview with "Australian Muscle Car" magazine for the November/December 2013 issue, Courtney revealed his first car was a Datsun 1200 ute powered by a turbocharged 2.0 litre engine. He described the car as "crazy" and that it would "spin the rear wheels in fifth gear, no problem". When he moved to England to pursue Formula Ford he gave the car to his father to use, who in turn gave it to his sister before it was sold, though Courtney revealed he wished he could now buy the car back.

Career results

Complete Super GT results

Complete Formula Nippon results
(key)

Supercars Championship results

Bathurst 1000 results

References

External links

Profile on Racing Reference

1980 births
British Formula Three Championship drivers
Formula Ford drivers
Formula Nippon drivers
Japanese Formula 3 Championship drivers
Living people
Racing drivers from Sydney
Sportsmen from New South Wales
Super GT drivers
Supercars Championship drivers
Carlin racing drivers
Karting World Championship drivers
TOM'S drivers
Andretti Autosport drivers
United Autosports drivers
Jaguar Racing drivers
Dick Johnson Racing drivers
Stone Brothers Racing drivers